Evodinus monticola is the species of the Lepturinae subfamily in long-horned beetle family. This beetle is distributed in Canada, and United States.

Subtaxa 
There are two subspecies in species:
 Evodinus monticola monticola (Randall, 1838) 
 Evodinus monticola vancouveri Casey, 1913

References

Lepturinae
Beetles described in 1838